Thursday Night in San Francisco is a blues album by Albert King, recorded live in 1968 at the Fillmore Auditorium. This album, together with Wednesday Night in San Francisco, contains leftovers recorded live on the same dates as Live Wire/Blues Power. Thursday Night in San Francisco, released in 1990, contains material recorded on June 27, 1968.

Track listing
"San-Ho-Zay" (Freddie King, Sonny Thompson) – 0:53
"You Upset Me, Baby" (B.B. King, Jules Taub) – 4:53
"Stormy Monday" (T-Bone Walker) – 8:37
"Every Day I Have the Blues" (Peter Chatman) – 4:17
"Drifting Blues" (Charles Brown, Johnny Moore, Eddie Williams) – 8:05
"I've Made Nights By Myself" (Albert King) – 6:44
"Crosscut Saw" (R.G. Ford) – 3:46
"I'm Gonna Move to the Outskirts of Town" (Andy Razaf, Casey Bill Weldon) – 7:41
"Ooh-ee baby" (Albert King) – 7:40

Personnel
 Albert King – electric guitar, vocals
 Willie James Exon – guitar
 James Washington – organ
 Roosevelt Pointer – bass
 Theotis Morgan – drums

References

1990 live albums
Albert King live albums
Albums recorded at the Fillmore
Albums produced by Al Jackson Jr.
Stax Records live albums
Live blues albums